Normand de Bellefeuille (born 31 December 1949, in Montreal) is a Quebecois poet, writer, literary critic, and essayist. He is a two-time winner of the Governor General's Award for French-language poetry, winning at the 2000 Governor General's Awards for La Marche de l'aveugle sans son chien and at the 2016 Governor General's Awards for Le poème est une maison de bord de mer.

Life 
He was born in Montréal.He studied at Cégep de Maisonneuve and at the Université de Montréal In 1972, he was a professor au Cégep de Maisonneuve. He was literary director at Québec Amérique from 1997 to 2010,
and at Éditions Druide. He appeared at Metropolis bleu.

Works 
 1973 : Monsieur Isaac, en collaboration avec Gilles Racette, l'Actuelle
 1974 : Ças suivi de Trois, Les Herbes Rouges, no 20
 1976 : Le Texte justement, Les Herbes Rouges, no 34
 1976 :  L'Appareil, en collaboration avec Marcel Labine, Les Herbes Rouges, no 38
 1977 : Les Grandes Familles, Les Herbes Rouges, no 52
 1978 : La Belle Conduite, Les Herbes Rouges, no 63
 1979 : Pourvu que ça ait mon nom, en collaboration avec Roger Des Roches, Les Herbes Rouges
 1980 : Dans la conversation et la diction des monstres, Les Herbes Rouges
 1983 : Le Livre du devoir, Les Herbes Rouges
 1984 : Miser, la Nouvelle Barre du Jour
 1984 : Straight Pose ou La Mort de Socrate, la Nouvelle Barre du Jour
 1984 : Les Matières de ce siècle, en collaboration avec Marcel Labine, Les Herbes Rouges, no 130
 1985 : Cold Cuts un/deux, Les Herbes Rouges, no 136
 1985 : À propos du texte/textualisation, en collaboration avec Jean Yves Collette, la Nouvelle Barre du Jour
 1985 : Lascaux, Les Herbes Rouges
 1986 : Quand on a une langue, on peut aller à Rome, en collaboration avec Louise Dupré, la Nouvelle Barre du Jour
 1986 : Catégoriques un deux et trois, Écrits des Forges
 1986 : À double sens, échange sur quelques pratiques modernes, en collaboration avec Hugues Corriveau, Les Herbes Rouges
 1987 : Heureusement, ici il y a la guerre, Les Herbes Rouges, 1987
 1989 : Ce que disait Alice, L'Instant même
 1991 : Obscènes, Les Herbes Rouges
 1993 : Notte Oscura, en collaboration avec Alain Laframboise, Le Noroît
 1997 : Nous mentons tous, Québec Amérique
 1999 : La Marche de l'aveugle sans son chien, Québec Amérique
 2001 : Un visage pour commencer, Écrits des Forges
 2001 : Lancers légers, Le Noroît 
 2003 : Elle était belle comme une idée, Québec Amérique
 2006 : Votre appel est important, Québec Amérique
 2009 : Mon nom, Le Noroît
 2010 : Un poker à Lascaux, Québec Amérique
 2011 : Mon visage, Le Noroît
 2012 : Mon bruit, Le Noroît
 2014 : Le poème est une maison de long séjour, Œuvres de Pierre P. Fortin, Le Noroît

Honors 
 1984 - Prix Émile-Nelligan, Le Livre du devoir
 1986 - Grand Prix de poésie de la Fondation des Forges Catégoriques un deux et trois
 1986 - Grand Prix du Festival international de la poésie
 1989 - Prix littéraire Adrienne-Choquette Ce que disait Alice 
 1989 - Concours de nouvelles de Radio-Canada, Ce que disait Alice
 1997 - Prix Félix-Antoine-Savard
 2000 - Prix Alain-Grandbois, La Marche de l'aveugle sans son chien
 2000 - 2e prix des Prix littéraires Radio-Canada
 2000 - Prix du Gouverneur général, La Marche de l'aveugle sans son chien
 2002 - Prix Odyssée en poésie
 2012 - Grand prix Québecor du Festival international de la poésie, Mon bruit

Notes 

Prix Alain-Grandbois
Canadian male poets
20th-century Canadian poets
20th-century Canadian male writers
21st-century Canadian poets
Canadian poets in French
Writers from Montreal
1949 births
Living people
Governor General's Award-winning poets
20th-century Canadian essayists
21st-century Canadian essayists
21st-century Canadian male writers
Canadian male essayists
Canadian non-fiction writers in French